A contact manager is a software program that enables users to easily store and find contact information, such as names, addresses, and telephone numbers. They are contact-centric databases that provide a fully integrated approach to tracking all information and communication activities linked to contacts. Simple ones for personal use are included in most smartphones. The main reference standard for contact data and metadata, semantic and interchange, is the vCard.

Sophisticated contact managers provide calendar sharing features and allow colleagues to access the same database. The main reference standard is the vCalendar.

In management terminology, advanced contact managers can be called individual resource management (IRM) or contact management (CM) tools – systems for managing an individual's interactions with current and future contacts, to organize, collaborate, and synchronize health, lifestyle, and financial needs.

History
Contact lists have been available for a long time. The original contact management system (CMS) was Exsell for DOS by Excalibur Sources, released in 1984.

Benefits
A contact management system (CMS) may be chosen because it is thought to provide the following advantages:
Centralized repository of contact information
Ready-to-use database with searching
Sales tracking
Email integration
Scheduling of appointments and meetings
Document management
Notes and conversation management
Customizable fields
Import/export utility
Contact sharing

Differences from customer relationship management 
Traditionally, a contact manager is usually used for instances where the sales interaction model of the organization is a one-to-many interaction model, in which a single sales representative is responsible for multiple roles within a company. Alternatively, a company with a many-to-many interaction model, in which many sales representatives are targeting a single job role, a customer relationship management (CRM) system is preferred.:. 

However, most recent contact management solutions are fully adapted to many-to-many interactions models, and the difference between a CRM and a Contact Manager starts to lay more on the fact that CRMs are commonly used to automate sales and marketing processes (quotes, invoices, reminder emails, etc.) where contacts management solutions focus on a people-centric approach which goal is to centralize all contact information within an organization and have better control on who can access this data and how it is accessed.

See also

 Address Book
 Automated online assistant
 Business intelligence
 Business relationship management
 Comparison of CRM systems
 Consumer relationship system
 Contact list
 Customer experience transformation
 Customer experience
 Customer intelligence
 Customer service – contains ISO standards
 Data management
 Data mining
 Database marketing
 E-crm
 Employee experience management (EEM)
 Enterprise feedback management (EFM)
 Event-driven marketing (EDM)
 Farley File
 Help desk
 Mystery shopping
 Partner relationship management (PRM)
 Predictive analytics
 Professional services automation software (PSA)
 Public relations
 Real-time marketing
 Sales force management system
 Sales intelligence
 Sales process engineering
 Supplier relationship management
 Support automation
 The International Customer Service Institute – contains customer service standards
 Vendor relationship management or VRM
 vCalendar (main "calendar interchange" standard)
 vCard (main "contact interchange" standard)

References

Data management software